Brentwood Elementary may refer to:
 Brentwood Elementary School, Spokane, Washington
 Wake County Public School System, Raleigh, North Carolina
 Brentwood Science Magnet Elementary School, Los Angeles, California
 Brentwood Elementary School (Sarasota, FL) Sarasota, FL